Hezekiah Oyugi (died 1992) was head of internal security for the Republic of Kenya in 1990 when Foreign Minister Robert Ouko was murdered. Both he and energy minister Nicholas Biwott were named as "principal suspects" in the crime by a British investigator during a commission of inquiry. Both were arrested but freed after two weeks for "lack of evidence".

References

 Cohen, David William & Odhiambo, E. S. Atieno (2004). The Risks of Knowledge: Investigations into the Death of the Hon. Minister John Robert Ouko in Kenya, 1990, Ohio University Press, . 

Kenyan civil servants
1992 deaths
Year of birth missing